In mathematics and in particular in combinatorics, the Lehmer code is a particular way to encode each possible permutation of a sequence of n numbers. It is an instance of a scheme for numbering permutations and is an example of an inversion table.

The Lehmer code is named in reference to Derrick Henry Lehmer, but the code had been known since 1888 at least.

The code
The Lehmer code makes use of the fact that there are

permutations of a sequence of n numbers. If a permutation σ is specified by the sequence (σ1, …, σn) of its images of 1, …, n, then it is encoded by a sequence of n numbers, but not all such sequences are valid since every number must be used only once. By contrast the encodings considered here choose the first number from a set of n values, the next number from a fixed set of  values, and so forth decreasing the number of possibilities until the last number for which only a single fixed value is allowed; every sequence of numbers chosen from these sets encodes a single permutation. While several encodings can be defined, the Lehmer code has several additional useful properties; it is the sequence

It follows that  is the total number of inversions of σ, which is also the number of adjacent transpositions that are needed to transform the permutation into the identity permutation. Other properties of the Lehmer code include that the lexicographical order of the encodings of two permutations is the same as that of their sequences (σ1, …, σn), that any value 0 in the code represents a right-to-left minimum in the permutation (i.e., a  smaller than any  to its right), and a value 
at position i similarly signifies a right-to-left maximum, and that the Lehmer code of σ coincides with the factorial number system representation of its position in the list of permutations of n in lexicographical order (numbering the positions starting from 0).

Variations of this encoding can be obtained by counting inversions (i,j) for fixed j rather than fixed i, by counting inversions with a fixed smaller value  rather than smaller index i, or by counting non-inversions rather than inversions; while this does not produce a fundamentally different type of encoding, some properties of the encoding will change correspondingly. In particular counting inversions with a fixed smaller value  gives the inversion table of σ, which can be seen to be the Lehmer code of the inverse permutation.

Encoding and decoding

The usual way to prove that there are n! different permutations of n objects is to observe that the first object can be chosen in  different ways, the next object in  different ways (because choosing the same number as the first is forbidden), the next in  different ways (because there are now 2 forbidden values), and so forth. Translating this freedom of choice at each step into a number, one obtains an encoding algorithm, one that finds the Lehmer code of a given permutation. One need not suppose the objects permuted to be numbers, but one needs a total ordering of the set of objects. Since the code numbers are to start from 0, the appropriate number to encode each object σi by is the number of objects that were available at that point (so they do not occur before position i), but which are smaller than the object σi actually chosen. (Inevitably such objects must appear at some position , and (i,j) will be an inversion, which shows that this number is indeed L(σ)i.)

This number to encode each object can be found by direct counting, in several ways (directly counting inversions, or correcting the total number of objects smaller than a given one, which is its sequence number starting from 0 in the set, by those that are unavailable at its position). Another method which is in-place, but not really more efficient, is to start with the permutation of {0, 1, … } obtained by representing each object by its mentioned sequence number, and then for each entry x, in order from left to right, correct the items to its right by subtracting 1 from all entries (still) greater than x (to reflect the fact that the object corresponding to x is no longer available). Concretely a Lehmer code for the permutation B,F,A,G,D,E,C of letters, ordered alphabetically, would first give the list of sequence numbers 1,5,0,6,3,4,2, which is successively transformed

where the final line is the Lehmer code (at each line one subtracts 1 from the larger entries to the right of the boldface element to form the next line).

For decoding a Lehmer code into a permutation of a given set, the latter procedure may be reversed: for each entry x, in order from right to left, correct the items to its right by adding 1 to all those (currently) greater than or equal to x; finally interpret the resulting permutation of {0, 1, … } as sequence numbers (which amounts to adding 1 to each entry if a permutation of {1, 2, … n} is sought). Alternatively the entries of the Lehmer code can be processed from left to right, and interpreted as a number determining the next choice of an element as indicated above; this requires maintaining a list of available elements, from which each chosen element is removed. In the example this would mean choosing element 1 from {A,B,C,D,E,F,G} (which is B) then element 4 from {A,C,D,E,F,G} (which is F), then element 0 from {A,C,D,E,G} (giving A) and so on, reconstructing the sequence B,F,A,G,D,E,C.

Applications to combinatorics and probabilities

Independence of relative ranks 

The Lehmer code defines a bijection from the symmetric group Sn to the Cartesian product , where [k] designates the k-element set .

Number of right-to-left minima and maxima 
Definition : In a sequence u(uk)1≤k≤n, there is right-to-left minimum (resp. maximum) at rank k if uk  is strictly smaller (resp. strictly bigger) than each element ui with i>k, i.e., to its right.

Let B(k) (resp. H(k)) be the event "there is right-to-left minimum (resp. maximum) at rank k", i.e. B(k) is the set of the permutations  which exhibit a right-to-left minimum (resp. maximum) at rank k. We clearly have

Thus the number Nb(ω) (resp. Nh(ω)) of right-to-left minimum (resp. maximum) for the permutation ω can be written as a sum of independent Bernoulli random variables each with a respective parameter of 1/k :

Indeed, as L(k) follows the uniform law on   

The generating function for the Bernoulli random variable  is 

therefore the generating function  of Nb is

(using the rising factorial notation),
which allows us to recover the product formula for the generating function of the 
Stirling numbers of the first kind (unsigned).

The secretary problem

This is an optimal stop problem, a classic in decision theory, statistics and applied probabilities, where a random permutation is gradually revealed through the first elements of its Lehmer code, and where the goal is to stop exactly at the element k such as σ(k)=n, whereas the only available information (the k first values of the Lehmer code) is not sufficient to compute σ(k).

In less mathematical words : a series of n applicants are interviewed one after the other. The interviewer must hire the best applicant, but must make his decision (“Hire” or “Not hire”) on the spot, without interviewing the next applicant (and a fortiori without interviewing all applicants).

The interviewer thus knows the rank of the kth applicant, therefore, at the moment of making his  kth decision, the interviewer knows only the k first elements of the Lehmer code whereas he would need to know all of them to make a well informed decision.
To determine the optimal strategies (i.e. the strategy maximizing the probability of a win), the statistical properties of the Lehmer code are crucial.

Allegedly, Johannes Kepler clearly exposed this secretary problem to a friend of his at a time when he was trying to make up his mind and choose one out eleven prospective brides as his second wife. His first marriage had been an unhappy one, having been arranged without himself being consulted, and he was thus very concerned that he could reach the right decision.

Similar concepts

Two similar vectors are in use. One of them is often called inversion vector, e.g. by Wolfram Alpha.
See also .

References

Bibliography

Combinatorics
Permutations
Resampling (statistics)